Argya is a genus of passerine birds in the family Leiothrichidae. The species are distributed across Africa and southern Asia and are typically fairly large, long-tailed birds that forage in noisy groups. Members of this genus were formerly placed in the genera Turdoides and Garrulax.

Taxonomy

Most of the species now placed in the genus Argya were previously assigned to the genus Turdoides. Following the publication of a molecular phylogenetic study in 2018, Turdoides was split and species were moved to the resurrected genus Argya that had been erected by the French naturalist René Lesson in 1831. The name is from the Latin argutus meaning "noisy". Lesson did not specify a type species but this was designated as the Arabian babbler (Argya sqamiceps) by the English zoologist George Robert Gray in 1855.

Species
The genus contains 16 species:

References

 
Bird genera
Leiothrichidae